James Campbell Cantrill (July 9, 1870 – September 2, 1923) was a U.S. Representative from Kentucky.

Background 
Born in Georgetown, Kentucky to Jennie Moore and James Edward Campbell, Cantrill attended the common schools, Georgetown (Kentucky) College, and the University of Virginia at Charlottesville.
He engaged in agricultural pursuits until his death.

Political career 
He served as chairman of the Scott County Democratic committee in 1895.

Cantrill was elected a member of the State house of representatives in 1897, and again in 1899.
He served in the State senate 1901-1905.
He was nominated for Congress in 1904, but declined.
He served as delegate to the Democratic National Convention in 1904.

Cantrill was elected president of the American Society of Equity for Kentucky, an organization of farmers, in 1908.

Cantrill was elected as a Democrat to the Sixty-first and to the seven succeeding Congresses and served from March 4, 1909, until his death during his campaign as the Democratic nominee for Governor of Kentucky.
He served as chairman of the Committee on Industrial Arts and Expositions (Sixty-fourth and Sixty-fifth Congresses).

Death
He died in Louisville, Kentucky in 1923 while campaigning as the Democratic nominee for governor.

He was interred in Georgetown Cemetery, in Georgetown, Kentucky.

See also
List of United States Congress members who died in office (1900–49)

References

External links

1870 births
1923 deaths
Democratic Party members of the Kentucky House of Representatives
Democratic Party Kentucky state senators
People from Georgetown, Kentucky
Democratic Party members of the United States House of Representatives from Kentucky